This article contains an overview of the year 2008 in athletics

International events

2008 Summer Olympics, held in Beijing, China
African Championships, held in Addis Ababa, Ethiopia
European Cup, super league held in Annecy, France
World Indoor Championships, held in Valencia, Spain
Golden League, held in various venues
World Athletics Final, held in Stuttgart, Germany
World Cross Country Championships, held in Edinburgh, United Kingdom
World Road Running Championships, held in Rio de Janeiro, Brazil
World Junior Championships, held in  Bydgoszcz, Poland

World records

Men

Women

Awards

Men

Women

Men's best year performances

100 metres

200 metres

400 metres

800 metres

1500 metres

3000 metres

5000 metres

10000 metres

110 metres hurdles

400 metres hurdles

3000 metres steeplechase

Half marathon

Marathon

High jump

Pole vault

Long jump

Triple jump

Shot put

Javelin throw

Discus throw

Hammer throw

Decathlon

Women's best year performances

100 metres

200 metres

400 metres

800 metres

1500 metres

3000 metres

5000 metres

10000 metres

100 metres hurdles

400 metres hurdles

3000 metres steeplechase

Half marathon

Marathon

High jump

Pole vault

Long jump

Triple jump

Shot put

Javelin throw

Discus throw

Hammer throw

Heptathlon

Deaths
June 9 — Peter Rwamuhanda (54), Ugandan hurdler (b. 1953)
December 22 — Jani Lehtonen (40), Finnish pole vaulter (b. 1968)

 
Athletics (track and field) by year